Afwaah is an unreleased Indian Hindi-language drama film written and directed by Sudhir Mishra. Produced by Anubhav Sinha and Bhushan Kumar under their respective banners Benaras Media Works and T-Series Films, the film stars Nawazuddin Siddiqui, Bhumi Pednekar and Taapsee Pannu.

Cast
 Nawazuddin Siddiqui
 Bhumi Pednekar
 Taapsee Pannu
 Sharib Hashmi
 Sumit Kaul
 Sumeet Vyas
 Carl Zohan

Production
The film was announced on 17 February 2022. Principal photography commenced on 21 June 2022 in Jodhpur, Rajasthan.

References

External links

Upcoming Hindi-language films